Chautauqua (foaled 20 September 2010) is a former and now retired champion Australian racehorse. He was bred as a thoroughbred, which is the superior breed for a racehorse. Chautauqua's grey colouring saw him receive the nickname “The Grey Flash”. Chautauqua raced 32 times, winning 6 group one races and earning AU$8,821,935 in prize money. This includes three successive Group 1 TJ Smith Stakes wins and a Group 1 Chairman's Sprint Prize (Hong Kong) win.

Chautauqua was co-trained by trainers Michael, Wayne and John Hawkes under their business, Hawkes Racing. The responsibility of the horse relies largely on the trainer. He was ridden by a number of jockeys including James Mcdonald, Dwayne Dunn, Brenton Avdulla but in most Group 1 wins by Tommy Berry.  Chautauqua was foaled in 2010 by the famous stallion Encosta De Lago and Dam Lovely Jubely. He was originally put on auction as a foal at the 2012 Inglis Australian Easter Yearling Sale held at the Berkley Park Stud in Scone and was passed in at AU$300,000 after not reaching the reserve of AU$400,000.

Chautauqua's racing colours are purple and yellow. The silk is purple with yellow stripes on the arm and a yellow lightning bolt on the front. It is also worn with a yellow helmet cover.

Famous for his come-from-behind victories, Chautauqua's career ended in controversy when he refused to leave the racing start gates on a multitude of occasions. Such behaviour is very rare in racing and therefore incited debate on animal welfare. This saw him subsequently retire in September 2018.

Racing career

2013–2014 season 
Chautauqua's race career began at the Seymour Race Club in a Maiden Plate race where he placed 2nd. He then moved to race at Kyneton the following week in another Maiden Plate race where he again placed 2nd. He was then spelled for 18 weeks before achieving his first win at Geelong in a 3-year-old Maiden Plate race. He next raced at Gosford where he achieved a place of 2nd and then the following week placed 7th in his first Group 2 Race. Chautauqua's first Group 3 win came the following week at Hawkesbury in the Hawkesbury Guineas. His final race of the season was run at Scone where he placed 7th and was subsequently spelled for 17 weeks.

2014–2015 season 
Chautauqua's 4-year-old season started successfully with two wins. Firstly, he won at Flemington in a Group 3 race and then the following week won his first Group 2 race again at Flemington. After a spell of 5 weeks, he again raced at Flemington and placed 2nd in his first Group 1 race. Chautauqua was then spelled for 14 weeks before winning another Group 2 race at Caulfield. He then travelled down to Flemington where he placed 2nd in a Group 1 race. His next race was his first Group 1 win at the TJ Smith Stakes raced at Randwick earning $1,400,000. Chautauqua's first TJ Smith Stakes win was won from last position. he overtook his fellow 9 opponents in the last 400m to narrowly beat Lord of the Sky at the finish. He then finished the season in the All Aged Stakes Group 1 race at Randwick, finishing 3rd. Afterward, he was spelled for 20 weeks.

2015–2016 season 
Chautauqua started the 2015 season with three wins. Firstly, in two Group 2 races at Flemington and Moonee Valley. His third consecutive win of the season came in the William Hill Manikato Stakes, a Group 1 race. This followed with four Group 1 placings at Flemington including a win in the Black Caviar Lightening Stakes. This led to Chautauqua's second consecutive TJ Smith Stakes win at Randwick. Chautauqua started his second TJ Smith Stakes as the favourite at $3.60. Again Chautauqua came from last place, overtaking 14 other opponents to claim the Group 1 race. He then flew to Hong Kong to race at the Sha Tin Racecourse in the Group 1 Chairman's Sprint which he won. Chautauqua allegedly refused to be saddled before his race in Hong Kong. He kicked off a shoe before being restrained and then proceeded to win with one of his trademark come from behind victories. After his cameo in Hong Kong  Chautauqua finished his season and was spelled for 21 weeks.

2016–2017 season 
Chautauqua's fourth season began placing 4th and 7th in Group 1 races at Moonee Valley. After a 16-week spell, Chautauqua placed 3rd in a Group 2 race at Caulfield. He then placed 2nd in the Canterbury Stakes at Randwick and 3rd in George Ryder Stakes at Rosehill. He finished the season with his third consecutive TJ Smith Stakes win edging English in the final strait. Chautauqua did not enter this race as the favourite at $6.50 and trailed the entire field until the last 250m, overtaking leaders English and Fell Swoop to create racing history. Chautauqua is the first horse to win the TJ Smith Stakes three times and also consecutively. He was then spelled for 21 weeks.

2017–2018 season 
Chautauqua's final season saw him compete in only four valid races. This included a 6th and 7th place in two Group 2 races at Randwick and then 4th place in the 2017 Everest Cup at Randwick. Chautauqua entered the inaugural Everest Cup in a star studded field as the second favourite at $5.50. He was boxed in during the final straight and therefore fell to a disappointing 4th. His final valid race of the season was at Flemington in the Darley Classic where he again placed 4th. Following this, Chautauqua failed to jump from the start box in six successive trials.

2018–2019 season 
Chautauqua again failed to start in his first trial of the 2018 season. Two weeks later he started in a trial placing 2nd and thus gave fans hope that his career was not over.

Chautauqua was given a final chance jump in a specially arranged Moonee Valley Friday night trial. This 1000m trial would have solidified Chautauqua's race position in the 2018 Everest Cup. Chautauqua did not jump and was subsequently retired officially that night by part owner Rupert Legh. He was given an applauded parade down the strait of the Moonee Valley Racecourse as a final farewell. Jockey Tommy Berry and co-trainer Michael Hawkes both admitted to being overcome with emotion after confirming the end of Chautauqua's race career. Chautauqua was then commissioned to lead out the 2018 Everest Cup Field as a Randwick farewell. On the following Saturday he was farewelled at Flemington by being paraded in the mounting yard. Chautauqua's exciting performances were adored by racing fans, evidencing the positive animal and human relationships displayed in sport. Chautauqua's career has helped support one of Australia's much loved sports, racing. Chautauqua has left a legacy with any 'come from behind' victories in racing being compared to the gelding or dubbed as "Chautauqua like victory".

Controversy on refusing to jump 
Chautauqua's refusal to leave the starting barriers was a rare and unseen issue encountered by Racing NSW before. After Chautauqua refused to leave the start box after consecutive races, the welfare of the horse was questioned. Co-trainer Michael Hawkes and owner Robert Legh both admitted to not understanding what was wrong with Chautauqua. Both claimed he was fit and healthy and just did not want to race. Equine doctor, Andrew Mclean believed Chautauqua was not suffering by constantly racing. Mclean believed Chautauqua's behaviour was being caused by a 'freeze response' which was being initiated by a large adrenalin surge as the barriers opened. After Chautauqua refused to jump for the sixth consecutive trial, Racing NSW considered banning him from racing as there was no current rule to govern horses did not leave the starting barriers. However, Chautauqua was instead retired by owners and trainers on his 7th consecutive incident at the start box in a trial during 2019.

Statistics 
Chautauqua retired as Australia's 3rd greatest stakes-earning sprinter behind sprinters Winx and Redzel. Chautauqua earned more than racing great Black Caviar. From his 32 starts, Chautauqua won 13 races and placed in 7. This left him with a win rate of 40.6% and a place rate of 75%. Chautauqua's 4-year career spanned almost 3 years more than the national average for a gelding.

Post Retirement 
Chautauqua now resides on a property in South Geelong. He is being trained as a show horse. He will be trained by former jockey Casey Bruce and horse racing broadcaster Rob Gaylard. Chautauqua's new daily regime includes trotting and circle work in order to be converted into a hack. Gaylard regards Chautauqua as “highly intelligent” and now goes by the show name ‘Sharky’. Chautauqua has since had a small 15 minute documentary made about his journey after racing and development as a show horse. It was titled 'Chautauqua - A New Journey' and the first instalment aired in April 2020 on Racing.com and Foxtel channel 529.

Pedigree 
Chautauqua is considered to have a strong pedigree line, being fathered by famous stallion, Encosta De Lago. Encosta De Lago has fathered many other champion racehorses including Alinghi, Princess Coup, Sacred Kingdom and Sirmione. Lion Hunter (Chautauqua's grandfather) is also considered to carry a strong line, having a world record number of wins from his offspring. Additionally Fairy King has sired horses which have achieved over 395 wins.

References 

2010 racehorse births
Racehorses bred in Australia
Racehorses trained in Australia
Thoroughbred family 8-k